Jazz Odyssey may refer to:
Jacob Fred Jazz Odyssey, a musical group
"Jazz Odyssey", a song by Audio Adrenaline from the album Bloom, 1996
"Jazz Odyssey", a song by Liquid Tension Experiment from the album Spontaneous Combustion, 2007
"Jazz Odyssey", a song by the Player Piano from the album Satellite, 2007